Chestnuts (Castanea species) are used as food plants by the larvae of a number of Lepidoptera species including:

Monophagous
Species which feed exclusively on Castanea

 Coleophoridae
 Coleophora leucochrysella – possibly extinct

Polyphagous
Species which feed on Castanea and other plants

 Bucculatricidae
 Bucculatrix demaryella
 Bucculatrix trifasciella
 Coleophoridae
 Coleophora anatipennella – recorded on sweet chestnut (C. sativa)
 Coleophora currucipennella
 Geometridae
 Colotois pennaria (feathered thorn)
 Ectropis crepuscularia (engrailed)
 Hemithea aestivaria (common emerald)
 Hepialidae
 Endoclita excrescens
 Endoclita sinensis
 Lymantriidae
 Euproctis chrysorrhoea (brown-tail)
 Euproctis similis (yellow-tail)
 Noctuidae
 Eupsilia transversa (satellite)
 Notodontidae
 Nadata gibbosa (rough prominent)

External links

Chestnut
+Lepidoptera